Hindoria is a town and a nagar panchayat in Damoh district in the Indian state of Madhya Pradesh.

Geography
It has an average elevation of 385 metres (1,263 feet). The peak of Bhondla is highest in Damoh district.

History
Hindoria Riyasat or jagir was established by Raja Budhh singh Lodhi a companion of Maharaja Chhatrasal Bundela. Hindoria Riyasat kept pace with national interests and under the able leaderships of Raja Kishore Singh Lodhi of Hindoria, Raja Devi Singh of Singrampur, Pancham Singh of Karijog, Gangadhar Rao, Raghunath Rao, Mejban Singh, Govind Rao, and some others fought against the British rule in the rebellion of 1857. Hindoria was the biggest village in Madhya Pradesh till 1980.

Demographics
The Hindoria city is divided into 15 wards for which elections are held every 5 years. The Hindoria Nagar Panchayat has population of 16,001 of which 8,304 are males while 7,697 are females as per report released by Census India 2011.

Population of Children with age of 0-6 is 2,301 which is 14.38% of total population of Hindoria (NP). In Hindoria Nagar Panchayat, Female Sex Ratio is of 927 against state average of 931. Moreover Child Sex Ratio in Hindoria is around 929 compared to Madhya Pradesh state average of 918. Literacy rate of Hindoria is 78.88% higher than state average of 69.32%. Male literacy is around 88.09% while female literacy rate is 68.93%.

Hindoria Nagar Panchayat has total administration over 3,287 houses to which it supplies basic amenities like water and sewerage.

Caste Factor
Schedule Caste (SC) constitutes 20.95% while Schedule Tribe (ST) were 5.06% of total population in Hindoria (NP).

Work Profile
Out of the total population, 7,135 were engaged in work or business activity. Of this 4,576 were males while 2,559 were females. In census survey, worker is defined as person who does business, job, service, and cultivator and labour activity. Of the total 7135 working population, 76.31% were engaged in Main Work while 23.69% of total workers were engaged in Marginal Work.

Education
Schools in Hindoria include:

Government Schools
 GOVT HSS BOYS, HINDORIA
 GOVT HSS GIRLS, HINDORIA
 GOVT MS BOYS, HINDORIA, JANPAD
 GOVT MS BOYS, SENIOR BASIC, HINDORIA
 GOVT MS GIRLS, HINDORIA
 GOVT PS GIRLS, HINDORIA
 GOVT PS HINDORIA
 GOVT PS HINDORIA, MUKERWA WARD
 GOVT PS HINDORIA, KILA WARD
 GOVT PS HINDORIA, KANCHAN PURA
 GOVT PS HINDORIA, CHIRAIPANI

Private Schools
 Shri Jageshwar Nath Middle School, Hindoria
 Saraswati Sishu Mandir Hindoria
 Gayatri Vidhya Peeth School, Hindoria
 Shri G.P.Choubey Memorial English Medium School, Hindoria
 Gyan Amrit English/Hindi Medium Middle School, Hindoria
 Kumud Karmarkar English Medium School, Hindoria
 Rajendra Pathak Memorial English Medium School, Hindoria
 Priyadarshni ball mandir school ,hindoria

Famous Personalities

Pradyuman Singh Lodhi
 Thakur Pradyumn Singh Lodhi elected as MLA from Malhera constituency in state assembly election 2018. He is member and head of royal house of Hindoria and descendant of Raja Kishore Singh Lodhi who rebelled against britishers in 1857.
 Elected again as MLA in the November 2020 by-election as BJP Candidate 53 BADAMAlHERA SEAT.
 Now in charge of Chairman of State civil supplies corporation (SCSC).
 Rank:- Cabinet Minister, MP Government.

Thakur Rahul Singh
 Thakur Rahul Singh Lodhi, member of Royal house of Hindoria and former member of legislative assembly of Madhya Pradesh from the Damoh constituency. He defeated the former finance minister of Madhya Pradesh.
 He also quit Congress and joined BJP but his fate was not same as his cousin, he lost the by election to Congress veteran Ajay Tondon from Damoh constituency seat.

References

Damoh